The rookie list is a means for Australian Football League (AFL) clubs to maintain additional players outside the 38-man primary or senior list. Rookie listed players are not eligible to play in AFL home-and-away or finals matches unless they are elevated to the senior list, either to replace a retired player or a player with a long-term injury.

Recruitment
There are two categories of rookie: Category A and Category B. Category A primarily represents players with a traditional Australian rules football development; Category B rookies are players from non-traditional recruiting backgrounds. Category A rookies are usually placed on the list via the rookie draft, which occurs annually during the off-season, immediately after the pre-season draft. As is the case with the AFL's other drafts, clubs are given the opportunity to select rookies in reverse ladder order, based on the previous season's results.

Several types of Category A rookies may be recruited directly by the clubs, without the need to put up for draft (although all such players are recorded against a late draft pick as a formality). This includes:
 International rookies
 Father-son selections – which are permitted only if the player has nominated for and not been selected in a National Draft

Category B rookies
Each club is permitted to recruit up to three "Category B" rookies. Category B rookies are recruited directly rather than drafted, and represent players from non-traditional recruiting backgrounds. Players who may be recruited as Category B rookies include:
International players, who are neither Australian citizens nor residents
Players from the New South Wales scholarship program
Players from the International scholarship program
Players from other sports, who have not been registered with an Australian rules football club for three years
Indigenous and multicultural players through their Next Generation Academy zones

In the specific case of Irish international rookies, a club may have no more than one Irish Category B rookie at a time; but, the club is permitted to recruit other Irish players as Category A rookies, and may still recruit them directly without putting them up for draft.

List maintenance
Each club is allowed to maintain a list of up to six eligible Category A rookies and three Category B rookies. Up to three rookies can be retained, with the player's permission for a second or third season, with the others having to be either delisted or elevated to the primary list at the time of the National Draft. Only half of the salary paid by a club to players on the rookie list counts towards the league's salary cap.

Generally speaking, a rookie-listed player cannot be selected to play in the senior AFL competition, and must play in state-level affiliated teams, except in two circumstances:
 At the start of a season, a club can nominate up to two veterans from its senior list for salary cap reasons; if a team does not have a full quota of veterans, it can make up the balance by nominating rookies to be eligible for senior selection. These players are known as nominated rookies.
 If a senior-listed player is moved onto the long-term injury list, a rookie-listed player can be temporarily elevated in his place, becoming eligible for senior selection, while the senior player remains injured.
There are usually plenty of opportunities to enact one of these rules, so rookie-listed players who are playing well enough for senior selection are seldom deprived of the opportunity by list management constraints.

History
The rookie list was established in 1997. It was initially aimed at providing recruitment opportunities for young players, in part filling a gap which had been left by the reduction in size of AFL lists from 52 to 42 players in 1994. At that time, rookie players must have been between the ages of 18 and 23 to qualify. In 2006, this was relaxed to allow each club to recruit a rookie older than 23 if he had never previously been on an AFL list. This has since been relaxed further, and now there no upper age or experience restrictions on Category A rookies.

In 2006, "International rookies" were identified for the first time as a separate class of rookie, covering international players from any countries except Ireland, in order to protect the AFL's relationship with the Gaelic Athletic Association. The "International rookie" category has since been expanded to the broader Category B.

The relaxing of eligibility criteria have resulted a notable semantic anomaly with the rookie list: that highly experienced players may serve on a club's rookie list, even though the word "rookie" is widely understood in most sports and professions to refer to a new or inexperienced person. For example, 's Heath Scotland spent his sixteenth and final AFL season on Carlton's rookie list, mostly to free up space on the club's primary list.

Before eligibility criteria were relaxed, special dispensation was granted for Adam Ramanauskas to be played on Essendon's rookie list in 2006. Ramanauskas had played over 100 AFL games for the club, but there was uncertainty over his playing future as he underwent treatment and recovery for cancer.

In 2014, Matthew Priddis was awarded the Brownlow Medal as the AFL's best and fairest player. Polling 26 votes, Priddis became the first player to win the award having begun his career on the rookie list.

Future
The Australian Football League Players' Association (AFLPA) has stated a desire to abolish the rookie list, in favour of an expanded 46 player roster. The AFLPA's main argument is that rookies now have the same workload as senior players – which was not necessarily true in the early days of the rookie list – but that their pay and opportunities are much lower than that of senior players.

Most successful rookies
Some of the most successful players (having played over 100 AFL games and/or kicked over 100 goals in the AFL) originally drafted into the AFL via the rookie system are:

 Michael Barlow
 Nathan Bassett
 Jarryd Blair
 Mark Blicavs
 Nathan Bock
 Matthew Boyd
 Luke Breust
 Dean Brogan
 Greg Broughton
 Shannon Byrnes
 Charlie Cameron
 Levi Casboult
 Andrew Carrazzo
 Robert Copeland
 Dean Cox
 Stewart Crameri
 Ed Curnow
 Aaron Davey
 Matt de Boer
 Michael Doughty
 Paul Duffield
 Aaron Edwards
 Michael Firrito
 Chad Fletcher
 Nathan Foley
 Josh Gibson
 Antoni Grover
 Heath Grundy
 Jarrod Harbrow
 Pearce Hanley
 Leigh Harding
 Roger Hayden
 Kieren Jack
 Sam Jacobs
 Mark Jamar
 Mark Johnson
 Darren Jolly
 Brett Jones
 Tadhg Kennelly
 Brett Kirk
 Rory Laird
 Tarkyn Lockyer
 Nathan Lovett-Murray
 Heritier Lumumba
 Quinten Lynch
 Martin Mattner
 Nick Maxwell
 James McDonald
 Jeremy McGovern
 Ben McGlynn
 Mal Michael
 Stephen Milne
 Dale Morris
 Shane Mumford
 Mark Nicoski
 Michael Osborne
 Joel Patfull
 Danyle Pearce
 Damien Peverill
 Liam Picken
 James Podsiadly
 Jason Porplyzia
 Matt Priddis
 Dean Rioli
 Russell Robertson
 Max Rooke
 Ben Rutten
 Aaron Sandilands
 Brad Sewell
 Cheynee Stiller
 Bret Thornton
 Greg Tivendale
 Shane Tuck
 Clinton Young

References

Australian Football League
Australian Football League draft
AFL Women's draft
Australian rules football terminology